Hovhannes Bedros XVIII Kasparian, I.P.C.B. (in Armenian Յովհաննէս Պետրոս ԺԸ Գասպարեան) English: John Petros XVIII Kasparian, French: Jean Pierre XVIII Kasparian (20 January 1927 – 16 January 2011) was the Armenian Catholic Catholicos-Patriarch of Cilicia from 1982-98 when he retired. He died in 2011.

Biography
He was born in Cairo and began his studies in 1943 at the Institut du Clergé Patriarcal de Bzommar. In 1946 he studied Philosophy and Theology at the Pontifical Gregorian University in Rome, Italy. He was ordained to the priesthood in 1952 and was vice-president of the Institut du Clergé Patriarcal de Bzommar and taught at Levonian School in Rome until 1957 when he was named as head of the Egyptian Armenian Catholic community. He was ordained as archbishop in 1972 and became Archbishop of Baghdad of the Armenian Catholic Church in Iraq starting 25 February 1973.

He was elected as the Catolicos-Patriarch of Cilicia of the Armenian Catholic Church in a synod meeting on 5 August 1982. The official ceremony was held in Bzommar, Lebanon on 12 September 1982. He ruled in difficult times of the Lebanese Civil War and its aftermath. After the declaration of the independence of Armenia, he also established a bishopric for the Armenian Catholics in Armenia, Georgia and its Armenian region of Javakheti.

Patriarch Kasparian retired in 1998 upon reaching the obligatory of 70 years according to the rules of the Armenian Catholic Church and withdrew to Bzommar. He died after a long illness on 16 January 2011, four days before his 84th birthday, in Lebanon.

See also

List of Armenian Catholic Patriarchs of Cilicia

References

Armenian Catholic Patriarchs of Cilicia
1927 births
2011 deaths
Members of the Patriarchal Congregation of Bzommar
21st-century Eastern Catholic clergy
20th-century Eastern Catholic bishops
Armenian Eastern Catholics
Egyptian people of Armenian descent
Clergy from Cairo